Ramonalinidae is an extinct family of marine bivalve molluscs from the late Anisian (early Middle Triassic). It was an edgewise-recliner with a flattened anteroventral surface (on which it rested) and partially fused valves. They formed distinctive mud mounds.

Taxonomy
 Ramonalina is thus far the only known genus.

References

 
Prehistoric bivalve families
Triassic first appearances
Triassic extinctions